Christmas Is 4 Ever is a 2006 Christmas-themed album by Parliament-Funkadelic bassist Bootsy Collins. The album was released in the United States by the Shout Factory label and by P-Vine Records in Japan. The album represents the first Christmas album made by any member of the P-Funk musical collective. The album features re-workings of Christmas standards such as "Silent Night", "Merry Christmas Baby", and "Sleigh Ride", as well as original compositions such as "Happy Holidaze".

Collins stated: "I’ve wanted to do a Christmas album forever, but I never really got the chance or the time to really think about doing it and putting the effort in it."

Track listing 

 "N-Yo-City" 3:05  	
 "Merry Christmas Baby" 4:30 	
 "Jingle Belz (Jingle Bells)" 4:58 	
 "Happy Holidaze" 6:29 	
 "Chestnutz (The Christmas Song)" 5:05 	
 "Winterfunkyland (Winter Wonderland)" 6:57 	
 "Santa's Coming (Santa Claus Is Coming to Town)" 4:58 	
 "Boot-Off (Rudolph the Red-Nosed Reindeer)" 5:23 	
 "Silent Night" (Traditional)  	5:34 	
 "Sleigh Ride"  6:03 	
 "Dis-Christmiss (This Christmas)" 3:27 	
 "Be-With-You"  6:12 
 "Christmas Is 4 Ever" 5:50

Personnel

 Don Bynum: Saxophone
 Bobby Byrd: Background Vocals
 Tobe Casual-T: Turntables
 Candis Cheatham: Vocals, Beats
 Keith Cheatham: Guitar, Keyboards, Background Vocals, Beats
 Keith Cheatham Jr., Miguel Cheatham: Beats & Raps
 Catfish Collins: Guitar
 Charlie Daniels: Fiddle, Background Vocals
 Matt Dawson: Vocals
 Snoop Dogg: Raps
 Tobe Donohue: Percussion
 Tyreka & Tyesha Grissom (Da Blessed Twins): Background Vocals
 Michael Hampton: Guitar
 Ian "Haiku" Herzog: Beatbox
 Jerome Johnson: Background Vocals
 Razor Johnson: Keyboards
 Ron Kat: Vocals
 Kendra & Kim: Background Vocals
 Johnny Mayfield: Background Vocals
 Blackbyrd McKnight: Guitar
 Morris Mingo: Keyboards & Drums
 The NastyNattihorns: Horns
 Melvin Parker: Drums
 Paul Patterson: Live Strings, Mandolins & Violins
 MC Danny Ray: Vocal Raps
 Razzberry: Vocals
 Garry Shider: Vocals, Guitar
 Sugarfoot: Background Vocals
 Randy Villars: Saxophone
 Frankie "Kash" Waddy: Drums
 Fred Wesley: Trombone
 Teddy Wilburn: Drums
 Danielle Withers: Vocals
 Belita Woods: Vocals
 Bernie Worrell: Clavinet, Piano
 Macy Gray: Vocals
 Bobby Womack: Vocals

And Christmas Messages from:
 Bishop Don Magic Juan
 Buckethead
 Moma Willis
 George Clinton
 Roger Troutman

References 

Bootsy Collins albums
2006 Christmas albums
P-Vine Records albums
Shout! Factory albums
Christmas albums by American artists